Hascombe Hill or Hascombe Camp is the site of an Iron Age multivallate hill fort close to the village of Hascombe in Surrey, England.

History

The site was excavated in 1931 by S. E. Winbolt, who dated the occupation of the site to the 1st century BC. The sides of the fort, which are naturally very steep, were scarped at the top to make them almost unassailable.

In the early 19th century it became an important naval telegraph station, using a mechanical form of semaphore to communicate with Netley Heath in Surrey on one side and Blackdown in Sussex on the other. A chain of such stations linked London with Portsmouth.

The height of Hascombe Hill is 644 feet.

In the 1990s the Modern Order of Druids erected a stone circle below the south-eastern slopes of Hascombe Hill.

References

Sources
 Surrey Archaeological Society Journal 40, p. 78
 Dyer, James The Penguin Guide to Prehistoric England & Wales (1981), p. 237

History of Surrey
Hill forts in Surrey
Iron Age sites in England
Buildings and structures in Surrey
Archaeological sites in Surrey